Koh-Lanta: Le Totem maudit is the twenty-third regular season of the French reality television series Koh-Lanta. 24 contestants are split into three tribes and sent to live and survive in the Calamian Islands of the Philippines where they compete against each other for immunity and reward while also avoiding tribal council. The main twist this season is The Cursed Totem which is given to the tribe or contestant that finishes last in a challenge where they'll receive a 'curse' that they must endure for their loss. The season premiered on 22 February 2022 on TF1.

Contestants

Challenges

Voting History

Notes

References

External links

French reality television series
Koh-Lanta seasons
2022 French television seasons